Live from Radio City Music Hall is a double album by the British heavy metal group Heaven & Hell which was released in 2007.  The set is a chronicle of the group's performance on 30 March 2007 at Radio City Music Hall in New York City.

Live from Radio City Music Hall is also available as a DVD.  The DVD was certified gold by the RIAA on 5 October 2007 selling 50,000 units. It was released on Blu-ray Disc in 2011.

Track listing
All songs written by Ronnie James Dio, Tony Iommi, Geezer Butler and Bill Ward except where noted.

The special 3-disc set for the US contains a DVD, tour program, backstage laminate, glossy photos of the band and other tour items available only through the Rhino Records website.

Personnel
Ronnie James Dio – vocals
Tony Iommi – guitars
Geezer Butler – bass
Vinny Appice – drums
Scott Warren - keyboards

Production 
Producer - Barry Ehrmann
Director - Milton Lage
Project Assistants - Kris Ahrend, Dutch Cramblitt, Jason Elzy, Rich Mahan, Steve Woolard
Engineering - Kooster McAllister, Paul Shatraw, Paul Special
Mixing - Wyn Davis, Mike Sutherland

Release dates 
24 August 2007 in Germany by SPV Records
27 August 2007 in the rest of Europe by SPV Records
28 August 2007 in the US by Rhino Records

Charts

Certifications

References 

Heaven & Hell (band) albums
2007 live albums
2007 video albums
Live video albums
Rhino Records live albums
Rhino Records video albums
Albums recorded at Radio City Music Hall